Prochoreutis extrincicella is a moth of the family Choreutidae. It is found in the United States, including Illinois, Maryland and Kentucky.

The forewings are pale straw yellow, with a pale brown basal area, median area, and terminal line. The antemedian line is broad and relatively straight. Black spots are present in an oblong patch near the anal angle in the pale postmedian area, with a small subterminal black dot above. There is faint blackish dusting along the veins of the upper postmedian area and there are metallic spots present in black spots. The fringe is straw with some brown on the outer edge. The hindwings are very pale drab yellow and the fringe is near white. The body is very pale brown.

Adults are on wing in June.

References

External links 
 mothphotographersgroup
 microleps.org

Prochoreutis